Broomfleet railway station serves the village of Broomfleet in the East Riding of Yorkshire, England. The station, and all trains serving it, are operated by Northern.

History
The station was opened on 1 July 1840 by the Hull and Selby Railway; originally named Bromfleet, it was renamed Broomfleet in January 1851 by the York and North Midland Railway. From October 1861 to November 1872 the station was not served by timetabled passenger trains. For many years it had a very sparse train service on market days only. A full service was introduced by the North Eastern Railway in October 1907.

Facilities
The station is an unstaffed halt with only basic shelters and timetable poster boards on offer. Tickets can only be bought on the train or prior to travel.  Step-free access is available to both platforms via ramps, but this is via the adjacent level crossing and so care is advised when using it.

Services
There is a limited and somewhat irregular service to and from Broomfleet with four trains per day Monday to Saturday towards Hull eastbound, but seven per day towards Doncaster or York westbound.  
There is no Sunday service.

References

External links 

Railway stations in the East Riding of Yorkshire
DfT Category F2 stations
Former Hull and Selby Railway stations
Railway stations in Great Britain opened in 1840
Northern franchise railway stations